Once Upon a Time in Mexico (also known as Desperado 2) is a 2003 American neo-Western action film written, directed, produced, photographed, scored, and edited by Robert Rodriguez. It is the third and final film in Rodriguez's Mexico Trilogy, and it is a sequel to 1992's El Mariachi and 1995's Desperado. The film features Antonio Banderas in his second and final performance as El Mariachi. In the film, El Mariachi is recruited by CIA agent Sheldon Sands (Johnny Depp) to kill a corrupt general responsible for the death of his wife, Carolina (Salma Hayek).

It was the first 'big budget' film to be shot in digital HD.  Once Upon a Time in Mexico received mixed reviews from critics, with praise for Depp's performance, but criticism for reducing its protagonist to an almost secondary character in his own trilogy and a convoluted plot. In the special features of the film's DVD, Rodriguez explained this was intentional, as he wanted this to be his The Good, the Bad and the Ugly of the trilogy. Once Upon a Time in Mexico grossed $98 million.

Plot
El Mariachi is recruited by CIA officer Sheldon Jeffrey Sands to kill General Emiliano Marquez, a corrupt Mexican Army officer who has been hired by Mexican drug lord Armando Barillo to assassinate the President of Mexico and overthrow the government during a period of unrest in Culiacán (the capital of Sinaloa) which is testing the presidency. Many years before, El Mariachi and his wife Carolina confronted Marquez in a shootout and wounded the general; in retaliation, Marquez took the lives of Carolina and their daughter in an ambush. In addition to El Mariachi, Sands persuades former FBI agent Jorge Ramírez to come out of retirement and kill Barillo, who had murdered his partner Archuleta in the past. Furthermore, AFN operative Ajedrez is assigned by Sands to tail Barillo.

While monitoring Barillo's activities, Ramírez meets Billy Chambers, an American fugitive who has been living under the protection of Barillo, but can no longer stomach the horrible tasks he's been forced to carry out for him. Ramírez convinces Chambers he will provide him protection in exchange for getting closer to Barillo by tagging Chambers' pet chihuahua with a hidden microphone, and Chambers agrees to complete the deal by surrendering to U.S. authorities once Barillo has been taken down. Sands' agent, Cucuy, originally hired to keep an eye on El Mariachi, instead turns and tranquilizes El Mariachi and turns him over to Barillo, also offering to reveal the details of Sands's plan. Cucuy, however, is promptly killed by Chambers while El Mariachi escapes from captivity and calls his friends Lorenzo and Fideo to assist him in his mission.

While monitoring Barillo's activity outside a hospital, Ramírez notices armed men storming the building and follows suit. He discovers that a group of doctors have been gunned down and Barillo has bled to death as a result of a botched facial reconstruction, but realizes that the corpse on the operating table is a body double before he is knocked out and kidnapped by the real Barillo and Ajedrez, who reveals herself to be Barillo's daughter. Sands realizes that his mission has been compromised, but is too late, as he is captured by Barillo and Ajedrez — who drill out his eyes before sending him out. Despite his blindness, he manages to gun down a hitman tailing him with the aid of a chicle boy.

As Culiacán celebrates the Day of the Dead during the President's visit, Marquez and his army storm in and attack the presidential palace. Marquez's troops, however, are met with resistance from not only the President's bodyguards, but also the citizens of Culiacán and the Mariachis. Sands had instructed El Mariachi to allow the President to be killed before attacking Marquez, but the Mariachis, concluding that the President is a good man, intervene early and protect him.  Marquez enters the presidential palace, only to once again confront El Mariachi, who shoots out his kneecaps before killing him with a headshot. Ramírez, who was released from captivity by Chambers, faces Barillo. After Barillo guns down Chambers, Ramírez and El Mariachi kill the drug lord. Sands manages to shoot the sadistic Ajedrez dead outside the presidential palace. Ultimately, Lorenzo and Fideo walk away with the cash that Barillo was using to pay Marquez, and help the president safely escape the attempted coup. Ramírez says goodbye to Sands and walks away, having avenged his partner's death. El Mariachi then gives his share of the cash to his home village before walking into the sunset.

Cast

In a 2003 issue of Rolling Stone, Depp was named as one of its "People of the Year", and gave an interview in which he briefly discussed his role as Sands:

The idea behind him is there was this guy I used to know in Hollywood, in the business, who on the outside was very charming – soft-spoken and almost hypnotic in the rhythm he used to speak. He refused to call me Johnny – always called me John. You knew this guy was aiming to fuck you over, but somehow you stuck around because he was just so fascinating to watch.

Depp also said in an Entertainment Weekly article that he "imagine[d] this guy wore really cheesy tourist shirts", that he had a "sideline obsession with Broadway", and that he favored strange, obvious disguises; all three qualities can be observed in the film. It was also revealed in the director's commentary on the DVD that Depp himself came up with the character's first and middle names.

Production
Made on a US$29 million budget, the film was shot in May 2001 before Spy Kids 2: The Island of Lost Dreams (2002) and Spy Kids 3-D: Game Over (2003) in order to avoid a potential Screen Actors Guild strike. Shooting took place over seven weeks in Querétaro, San Miguel de Allende and Guanajuato, Mexico. It was the first big budget film to be shot in high definition digital video. Rodriguez chose to shoot on digital after George Lucas, who was shooting Star Wars: Episode II – Attack of the Clones, showed him early footage shot digitally. Impressed, Rodriguez chose to shoot digitally, but he knew he did not have enough time to shoot Spy Kids 2. Instead, he pitched a sequel to Desperado to Miramax and wrote a script in six days. The initial draft was 65 pages long, which he padded with a subplot borrowed from an unproduced short film. When Miramax expressed hesitation over the added subplot, he readily removed it. His primary influence was Sergio Leone's Dollars Trilogy, specifically The Good, The Bad, and The Ugly. Rodriguez said shooting digitally saved time and money, simplified the filming process, and rendered 35 mm film obsolete for him.

Soundtrack

The film's score includes songs composed by director Robert Rodriguez and performed by a group of musicians gathered specifically for the soundtrack recording. Tracks performed by the group includes "Malagueña" with guitar by Brian Setzer and "Siente Mi Amor", with singing by Salma Hayek. Track 9, "Sands' Theme", credited to "Tonto's Giant Nuts", was written by Johnny Depp.  Additional music includes Juno Reactor's "Pistolero", "Me Gustas Tú" by Manu Chao, and "Cuka Rocka" by Rodriguez' own rock band, Chingon. On the DVD director commentary, Robert Rodriguez states that he requested that each of the main actors give him four or eight notes of a melody for their character, but Depp presented him with the entire track.
 "Malagueña" (Brian Setzer) – 4:22
 "Traeme Paz" (Patricia Vonne) – 2:56
 "Eye Patch" (Alex Ruiz) – 1:51
 "Yo Te Quiero" (Marcos Loya) – 3:48
 "Guitar Town" (Robert Rodriguez) – 2:04
 "Church Shootout" (Robert Rodriguez) – 1:38
 "Pistolero" (Juno Reactor) – 3:38
 "Me Gustas Tú" (Manu Chao) – 3:49
 "Sands (Theme)" (Tonto's Giant Nuts) – 3:24
 "Dias de Los Angeles" (Rick Del Castillo) – 5:08
 "The Man with No Eyes" (Robert Rodriguez) – 2:09
 "Mariachi vs. Marquez" (Robert Rodriguez) – 1:33
 "Flor del Mal" (Tito Larriva & Steven Hufsteter) – 3:13
 "Chicle Boy" (Robert Rodriguez) – 1:30
 "Coup de Etat" (Robert Rodriguez) – 3:02
 "El Mariachi" (Robert Rodriguez) – 1:22
 "Siente Mi Amor" (Salma Hayek) – 4:24
 "Cuka Rocka" (Chingon) – 1:44

Television adaptation
Sony's AXN channel confirmed that it will be airing a TV series adaptation of El Mariachi franchise. The series was to have premiered on March 20, 2014.

Release
Once Upon a Time in Mexico was released in United States on September 12, 2003 by Sony Pictures Releasing through Columbia Pictures and Internationally by Miramax International through Buena Vista International, in 3,282 theaters with an opening weekend gross of US$23.4 million. It went on to make $56.4 million in North America and $41.8 in the rest of the world for a combined total of $98.2 million on a $29 million budget.

Reception
On Rotten Tomatoes, Once Upon a Time in Mexico holds an approval rating of 66% based on 168 reviews, with an average rating of 6.20/10. The site's critics consensus reads: "Violent, pulpy, loopy fun, with Depp stealing the show." On Metacritic, the film has a weighted average score of 56 out of 100 based on 34 critics, indicating "mixed or average reviews"
. Audiences surveyed by CinemaScore gave the film an average grade of "B−" on an A+ to F scale.

Chicago Sun-Times film critic Roger Ebert gave the film three out of four stars and wrote, "Like Leone's movie, the Rodriguez epic is more interested in the moment, in great shots, in surprises and ironic reversals and closeups of sweaty faces, than in a coherent story." A. O. Scott wrote in his review for The New York Times, "But in the end, the punched-up editing and vibrant color schemes start to grow tiresome, and Mr. Rodriguez, bored with his own gimmickry and completely out of ideas, responds by pushing the violence to needlessly grotesque extremes."

In her review for USA Today, Claudia Puig wrote, "In Mexico, Rodriguez has fashioned a swaggering fantasy that pays homage to spaghetti Westerns such as Sergio Leone's The Good, the Bad and the Ugly. Plenty of blood is shed, much powerful artillery is fired, and action sequences provide astounding car crashes and fiery explosions." Writing for Entertainment Weekly, Owen Gleiberman gave the film a "B" rating and praised Depp's performance with its "winking grace notes of Brandoesque flakery ... is as minimal and laid-back as his Pirates of the Caribbean turn was deep-dish theatrical".

See also
 Livin' la Vida Loca

References

External links

 
 

2003 films
2003 Western (genre) films
American Western (genre) films
American action films
Spanish-language American films
Day of the Dead films
Films about Mexican drug cartels
Films about the Central Intelligence Agency
Films about guitars and guitarists
American films about revenge
Gun fu films
Mexico Trilogy
Films about coups d'état
Columbia Pictures films
Dimension Films films
Troublemaker Studios films
Buena Vista International films
Films scored by Robert Rodriguez
Films directed by Robert Rodriguez
Films produced by Elizabeth Avellán
Films produced by Robert Rodriguez
Films set in Mexico
Films shot in Mexico
Films with screenplays by Robert Rodriguez
2000s English-language films
2000s American films
2000s Mexican films